Admiral Thomas may refer to:

Cari Batson Thomas (fl. 1980s–20210s), U.S. Coast Guard rear admiral
Charles Thomas (Canadian admiral) (born 1936), Royal Canadian Navy vice admiral
Charles Mitchell Thomas (1846–1908), U.S. Navy rear admiral
Charles W. Thomas (captain) (1903–1973), U.S. Coast Guard rear admiral
Chauncey Thomas Jr. (1850–1919), U.S. Navy rear admiral
David M. Thomas Jr. (born 1958), U.S. Navy rear admiral
Davyd Thomas (born 1956), Royal Australian Naval Reserve rear admiral
Gerald Eustis Thomas (1929–2019), U.S. Navy rear admiral
Karl O. Thomas (born 1963), U.S. Navy vice admiral
Paul F. Thomas (born 1963), U.S. Coast Guard vice admiral
Richard Thomas (Royal Navy officer) (1932–1998), British Royal Navy admiral
Richard Darton Thomas (1777–1857), British Royal Navy admiral
William Nathaniel Thomas (1892–1971), U.S. Navy rear admiral